RAH or Rah may refer to:

Rah
 Rah (slang), British English slang for a young snob
 Rah, claimed by James Churchward to be the Naacal sun-god
 Ra (island), Vanuatu, often spelled Rah
 Rah Rah (band), Regina, Saskatchewan, Canada
 Rah (Mark Murphy album), 1961
 Rah (Billy Hart album), 1988

RAH
 Right atrial hypertrophy
 Right At Home Realty, Toronto, Canada
 Royal Albert Hall, England
 Royal Alexandra Hospital (Edmonton), Canada
 Royal Alexandra Hospital, Paisley, hospital in Scotland
 Royal Alexandra Hospital, Rhyl, hospital in Wales
 Royal Adelaide Hospital, Australia
 Real Academia de la Historia (Royal Academy of History), Spain
 Richard Anthony Hewson's 1970s RAH band
 Robert A. Heinlein, science fiction author
 Boeing–Sikorsky RAH-66 Comanche, a military plane

See also

 
 
 
 
 RAHS (disambiguation)
 Rah-rah (disambiguation)
 Ra (disambiguation)